Sinfonia of London is a session orchestra based in London, England, and conducted by John Wilson.

The current orchestra is the third of three distinct ensembles of this name. The original Sinfonia of London was founded in 1955 by Gordon Walker, an eminent flautist of his time, specifically for the recording of film music. The orchestra came into being when there was a split in the future direction of the London Symphony Orchestra, many LSO players leaving to join the Sinfonia of London in order to undertake the more lucrative film soundtrack work. The orchestra appeared in the musical credits of many British and American films of the 1950s and '60s, including the 1958 soundtrack for the Alfred Hitchcock thriller Vertigo with Bernard Herrmann's score conducted by Muir Mathieson for  Mercury Records and, in 1961, the soundtrack of the horror film Gorgo.

Among the original ensemble's most celebrated commercial classical recordings are the first recording made by Colin Davis, comprising Mozart's Symphonies 29 and 39 and issued by World Record Club (TZ 130) along with its 1963 recordings with Sir John Barbirolli conducting the Serenade for Strings of Edward Elgar and the Fantasia on a Theme of Thomas Tallis of Ralph Vaughan Williams for EMI Classics. Hans Swarowsky conducted the ensemble in a World Record Club LP (WRC T 11) of Beethoven's 5th Symphony and  Egmont Overture. The original orchestra ceased to perform during the 1960s.

In 1982 the title Sinfonia of London was bought by Peter Willison and Howard Blake from the Walker family for the purpose of having a named orchestra for the first recording of The Snowman. In February 1998, Bruce Broughton was named the orchestra's second musical director after Blake.  Under Peter Willison's management, the orchestra went on to record many soundtracks for major Hollywood films, including Batman, The Mummy Returns, Lara Croft: Tomb Raider, Lost in Space, The Lawnmower Man, Stargate, Tombstone, RoboCop and Young Sherlock Holmes.

Sinfonia of London was reformed into its third incarnation in 2018 by the conductor John Wilson to undertake a series of recording projects, beginning with a recording of Korngold's Symphony in F Sharp on the label Chandos.

Notes

References

External links
 Harry Downey, Music-Web International web page, review of EMI Classics CDM5 67240 2, April 2000

London orchestras